Dejan Jekovec (born 22 August 1974) is a Slovenian ski jumper. He competed in the normal hill event at the 1994 Winter Olympics.

References

1974 births
Living people
Slovenian male ski jumpers
Olympic ski jumpers of Slovenia
Ski jumpers at the 1994 Winter Olympics
People from Tržič